Alinda biplicata, also known as Balea biplicata, common name the two lipped door snail or Thames door snail, is a species of air-breathing land snail, a terrestrial pulmonate gastropod mollusk in the family Clausiliidae, the door snails, all of which have a clausilium.

Distribution
This species is known to occur in a number of European countries and islands including:

 Czech Republic
 Poland
 Slovakia
 Hungary
 Romania
 Bulgaria
 Greece
 Slovenia
 Croatia
 Serbia
 Switzerland
 Austria
 Germany
 France
 Belgium
 Netherlands
 Denmark
 Sweden
 Great Britain

This species is rare in Great Britain. In England, it is found mainly in the London area, almost exclusively along the River Thames, and is particularly preserved at Isleworth Ait. There is also a colony at Purfleet in Essex.

Description 
Like all species in this family, this snail has a clausilium. This spoon-shaped "door" is supported by, and slides in, a series of internal shell folds, see the image below.

The weight of the adult live snail is 148.6±5.7 mg.

References

External links 

 Balea biplicata at AnimalBase
 Balea biplicata at BioLib with images and synonyms
 images
 Photo of a mating pair: 
 Sulikowska-Drozd A., Maltz T. K. & Kappes H. (2013). "Brooding in a temperate zone land snail: seasonal and regional patterns". Contributions to Zoology 82(2): http://www.ctoz.nl/vol82/nr02/a02

Clausiliidae
Molluscs of Europe
Gastropods described in 1803
Taxa named by George Montagu (naturalist)